Kumon Institute Education Co. Ltd. is an educational network based in Japan and created by Toru Kumon. It uses his Kumon Method to teach mathematics and reading primarily for young students.

History
Kumon was founded by Toru Kumon, a Japanese educator, in July 1958, when he opened the first Kumon Maths Centre in Moriguchi, Osaka. Prior to creating the Kumon franchise, Kumon taught at Kochi Municipal High School and Tosa Junior/Senior High School. Inspired by teaching his own son, Takeshi, Kumon developed a curriculum focused on rote memorization.

Kumon initially grew slowly, only gaining 63,000 students over its first 16 years. However, in 1974, Kumon published a book titled The Secret of Kumon Math, leading to a doubling of its size in the next two years. Kumon opened their first United States locations in 1983, and by 1985, Kumon reached 1.4 million students.

Kumon soon added more educational subjects, leading them to change their name from Kumon Institute of Mathematics to Kumon Institute of Education. At this point, the first Kumon Logo was created. In 1985, Kumon's success lead to an increase in enrollments.

Kumon attracted national attention in the United States after it was implemented at Sumiton Elementary School, in Sumiton, Alabama. This was the first instance in which an American school integrated the Kumon Math Method into the regular K–4 mathematics curriculum. Sumiton continued to use the Kumon program through 2001, and influenced other schools to also adopt the Kumon method in their curriculum.

As of 2008, Kumon had over 26,000 centres around the globe with over 4 million registered students. As of 2018, there were 410,000 students enrolled in 2,200 centers across the United States.

Kumon produced Baby Kumon in Japan in 2012, a tutoring program targeted for children between 1–2 years old. Baby Kumon hasn't been utilized in most Kumon Centres in other countries outside Japan. In North America, Kumon began a "Junior Kumon" program in 2001, targeted at children aged 2–5 years old.

Kumon method of learning

Kumon is an enrichment or remedial program, where instructors and assistants tailor instruction for individual students.

Each student is given an initial assessment of their abilities called the Kumon Diagnostic Test. Each test has 20–60 questions. Based on the results and the student's study skills, a Kumon Instructor creates an individualized study plan.

Students commonly begin Kumon at an easy starting point to build study habits, concentration and a strong understanding of the fundamental topics. As students progress, Kumon instructors raise the difficulty level to challenge the students so they remain motivated, but not so high as to discourage them.

The study plan is regularly updated by the Kumon instructor to match the ability of each student. Students advance to the next level after they complete a mastery test of speed and accuracy. Students do not pass or fail the mastery test, but are given chances to practice and retake the exam until they have demonstrated a sound understanding of the material.

Kumon has two core programs, the Kumon Math and Kumon Native Language Programs. There are also Kumon Japanese and Kumon Kokugo courses for Japanese language speakers, and a Pencil Skills Program for younger students.

All Kumon programs are pencil-and-worksheet-based. The worksheets increase in difficulty in small increments. The program recommends that students study 30 minutes per subject on their own for five days of the week, and visit their local Kumon Center or attend a virtual class the other two days.

Programs

Mathematics program
As a high school mathematics teacher, Mr. Kumon understood that an understanding of calculus was essential for Japanese university entrance exams so in writing worksheets for his son, Mr. Kumon focused on all the topics needed for a strong understanding of calculus starting from the basics of counting. Kumon students do not use calculators and solve all problems using mental calculation. Kumon tutoring is in a group of 6 students to one tutor. A student is known as a Kumon Completer once they reach the final level of the Kumon Math or Kumon Native Language program.

Reading program
The Kumon Native Language Programs are designed to expose students to a broad range of texts and develop the skill of reading comprehension. A number of Kumon Centres also use audio CDs to help students with pronunciation. (Note: Levels vary slightly by country) Kumon is also beginning to develop non-Native language programs more extensively. For example, in Spain, Mexico, and the South American countries that have Kumon Math programs, English will be added as a second language over the coming year.

Criticism

Psychologist Kathy Hirsh-Pasek claims that using such techniques, when used in 2, 3, and 4-year-olds, "does not give your child a leg up on anything". However, studies have shown a high percentage of efficacy.

See also
Storefront school

References

External links

Kumon Group official website
Kumon Japan website (in Japanese)

Education companies of Japan
Pedagogy
Education companies established in 1958
1958 establishments in Japan